Tommy Limby  (5 September 1947, Gåxsjö, Jämtland – 14 January 2008) was a  Swedish cross-country skier who competed in the 1970s. He earned a gold medal in the 4 × 10 km relay at the 1978 FIS Nordic World Ski Championships in Lahti.

In 1974 he participated in the Orsa IF men's team winning the Swedish national relay championship.

Limby finished third in the Vasaloppet in 1977.

He died on 14 January 2008 at the age of 60.

Cross-country skiing results

Olympic Games

World Championships
 1 medal – (1 gold)

References

External links
Obituary 
World Championship results 

1947 births
2008 deaths
People from Strömsund Municipality
Cross-country skiers from Jämtland County
Swedish male cross-country skiers
Cross-country skiers at the 1976 Winter Olympics
Olympic cross-country skiers of Sweden
FIS Nordic World Ski Championships medalists in cross-country skiing